Ahmednagar Lok Sabha constituency is one of the 48  parliamentary constituencies of the Lok Sabha in the state of Maharashtra.

Assembly segments
Presently, after the implementation of the Presidential notification on delimitation on 19 February 2008, Ahmednagar Lok Sabha constituency comprises six Vidhan Sabha (legislative assembly) segments. These segments are:

Members of Parliament

^bypoll

Election results

General Elections 2019

General Elections 2014

General Elections 2009

See also
 Ahmednagar district
 List of Constituencies of the Lok Sabha

References

External links
Ahmednagar lok sabha  constituency election 2019 results details

Lok Sabha constituencies in Maharashtra
Ahmednagar district
Constituencies established in 1952
1952 establishments in Bombay State